Clermont is a township municipality in northwestern Quebec, Canada, in Abitibi-Ouest Regional County Municipality. It had a population of 482 in the Canada 2011 Census. The population centre itself is also known as Saint-Vital-de-Clermont.

The township was incorporated on March 4, 1936.

Demographics 

Politics
Alexandre D. Nickner was elected November 3, 2013 as mayor of St-Vital of Clermont. By doing so, he became the youngest mayor of Quebec at the age of only 20 years. After his 4 years mayorship, Nickner decided to quit politics to focus on his company. Daniel Céleste, deputy mayor during Nickner's period, became mayor by defaut in November 2017.

List of mayors:

 2017-2021: Daniel Céleste
 2013-2017: Alexandre D. Nickner
 2010-2013: Robert Paquette
 2009-2010: Doris Souligny
 2005-2009: Lucie Hardy
 1993-2005: Michel Mercier
 1975-1993: Roch Gagnon
 1962-1975: Roland Guindon
 1960-1962: Donat Marier

 1958-1960: Paul Clément
 1957-1958: Henri Pilon
 1954-1957: Arthur Lauzon
 1950-1954: Henri Pilon
 1945-9150: Donat Marier
 1941-1945: Sijefroid Bélair
 1936-1941: Joseph Gauthier

See also
 List of township municipalities in Quebec

References

Township municipalities in Quebec
Incorporated places in Abitibi-Témiscamingue
Populated places established in 1936
1936 establishments in Quebec